This is a list of French television related events from 2001.

Events
26 April - The television reality show Loft Story debuts on M6.
5 July - The first series of Loft Story is won by Christophe Mercy and Loana Petrucciani.

Debuts
26 April - Loft Story (2001-2002)
20 October - Star Academy (2001-2008, 2012-2013)

International
 CSI: Crime Scene Investigation (Unknown)

Television shows

1940s
Le Jour du Seigneur (1949–present)

1950s
Présence protestante (1955-)

1970s
30 millions d'amis (1976-2016)

1990s
Sous le soleil (1996-2008)

Ending this year

Births

Deaths

Igor Barrère -  (17 December 1931 – 24 June 2001)

See also
2001 in France

References